Burundi Red Cross, also known as BRC (CRB) was founded in 1963, formed on the basis of the 1949 Geneva Conventions and the 1977 Additional Protocols. It maintains headquarters in Bujumbura, Burundi.

The BRC was involved in the disaster management response to the 2019 Burundi landslides, specifically the immediate situation assessment of the casualties, relocation, and provision of material aid to displaced persons as well as the burial of recovered bodies. The organisation is currently involved in the management of the COVID-19 pandemic.

References

External links
International Federation of Red Cross and Red Crescent Societies

Red Cross and Red Crescent national societies
1963 establishments in Burundi
Organizations established in 1963
Medical and health organisations based in Burundi